Sultan Shah may refer to:

Shah Berunai, eighth Sultan of Brunei
Shah Jahan Begum of Bhopal, ruler of Bhopal from 1844–1860 and 1868–1901
Sultan Shah ibn Radwan, Seljuk sultan of Aleppo
Sultan Shah of Khwarezm, claimant to the title of Khwarazmshah
Sultan Shahriar Rashid Khan, Bangladeshi army officer